My Fatal Kiss is a studio album by German Symphonic Metal band Krypteria, released on August 28, 2009. While not a classic concept album it has been observed to deal with ambivalence and man's "inner demons".

On July 17, 2009, the first single, "Ignition", was made available for free download through the official Krypteria website by signing up for their newsletter.  A music video then followed for the track "For You I'll Bring The Devil Down."

My Fatal Kiss peaked at position 63 in the German album charts.

Track listing

Credits
Ji-In Cho - Vocals
Chris Siemons - Guitar
Frank Stumvoll - Bass
S.C. Kuschnerus - Drums

References

Krypteria albums
2009 albums